Create is an American digital broadcast public television network broadcast on digital subchannels of PBS member stations. The network broadcasts how-to, DIY and other lifestyle-oriented instructional programming 24 hours a day.

History
Create was launched on WGBH-TV DTV/Comcast Cable and WLIW DTV/Cablevision digital services, WNET's sister station, in 2004. Create was launched nationally on January 9, 2006.

In 2009, APT started looking for a national network underwriter, while seven stations had found local underwriters that covered their network fees. Ten stations at this time were inserting local programming.

With rating data becoming available with more experience handling multicast channels and greater licensing fees, some public TV stations were changing their channel lineup. Some were dropping a network off a channel and programming it independently. A well-known station, WETA-TV, dropped Create on its .2 channel for an independent how-to channel in January 2012. The previous lack of audience data stymied efforts to find a national underwriter. In 2012, APT started planning for more original and exclusive programming. A March national pledge event, a recent new funding source for Create, with travel host Rick Steves, took in at a top 20 market about $40,000. Licensing fees were to be reinstated on July 1, 2012.

Operations
American Public Television (APT), WGBH and WNET operate the network. APT handles affiliate relations, distribution, marketing and underwriting, and producer and viewer relations. A joint team creates the schedule with all working together on strategic and business planning. WNET produces promos and spots for the network and provides master control services.

It is distributed through digital subchannel affiliations with public television stations that are members of or subscribe to APT Exchange, NETA and PBS Plus. Stations' licensing fees fall into one of five price tiers based on budget, market and station size. Shop Create webstore also generates income for the network.

Shows
Create broadcasts Arts & Crafts, Food, and Travel shows.

Arts & Crafts
"Beads, Baubles, and Jewels"
"Best of Bob Ross"
"Fit to Eat" hosted by Rob Stinson
"Craft in America"
"Canvasing The World With Sean Diedike"
"Craftman's Legacy"

Food
100 Days, Drinks, Dishes and Destinations
America's Test Kitchen
America's Test Kitchen Special: Home for the Holidays
Baking with Julia
Bringing It Home with Laura McIntosh
Buen Provecho! Florida's Spanish Flavor
Chef Paul Prudhomme: Louisiana Legend
Chef's Life
Chef's Life: The Final Harvest
Christina Cooks
Christina Cooks: Back to the Cutting Board
Christopher Kimball's Milk Street Television
Ciao Italia
Confucius Was A Foodie
Cook's Country
Cooking with Nick Stellino
Dining With the Chef
Dishing with Julia Child
Eating In with Lidia
Ellie's Real Good Food
Essential Pépin
Family Ingredients
Farmer and the Foodie
Field Trip with Curtis Stone
Fit to Eat (Mississippi cooking show)
Flavor of Poland
Food Flirts
French Chef Classics
George Hirsch Lifestyle
Great American Seafood Cook-Off 
Home for Christy Rost: Thanksgiving, A
Houston Cookbook
How She Rolls
How to Cook Well at Christmas with Rory O'Connell
How to Cook Well with Rory O'Connell
Hubert Keller: Secrets of a Chef
In Julia's Kitchen with Master Chefs
Iowa Ingredient
Jacques Pépin: Heart & Soul
Jamie Oliver Together
Jazzy Vegetarian
Joanne Weir's Plates and Places
Julia Child - Cooking with Master Chefs
Julie Taboulie's Lebanese Kitchen
Kevin Belton's Cookin' Louisiana
Kevin Belton's New Orleans Celebrations
Kevin Belton's New Orleans Kitchen
Kitchen Queens: New Orleans
Lidia's Kitchen
Lucky Chow
Maria's Portuguese Table
Mike Colameco's Real Food
Modern Pioneering with Georgia Pellegrini
Moveable Feast with Relish
My Greek Table with Diane Kochilas
Neven's Irish Food Trails
Neven's Spanish Food Trails
New Day New Chef
New Orleans Cooking With Kevin Belton
New Scandinavian Cooking
Nick Stellino: Storyteller in the Kitchen
No Passport Required
P. Allen Smith's Garden Home
Pati's Mexican Table
Primal Grill with Steven Raichlen
Roadfood
Sara's Weeknight Meals
Savor Dakota 
Simply Ming
Somewhere South
Steven Raichlen's Project Fire
Steven Raichlen's Project Smoke
Taste of Louisiana with Chef John Folse & Co.: Our Food Heritage
Taste Of Louisiana With Chef John Folse & Company: Hooks, Lies & Alibis
Taste of Malaysia with Martin Yan
Taste The Florida Keys with Chef Michelle Bernstein
tasteMAKERS
The Great American Recipe
The Hook
To Dine for with Kate Sullivan
Trails to Oishii Tokyo
Weekends with Yankee
Welcome to My Farm
Wine First
Yan Can Cook: Spice Ki

Travel
Afro-Latino Travels with Kim Haas
Art Wolfe's Travels to the Edge
At One with Nature: National Parks of Japan
Bare Feet In NYC with Mickela Mallozzi
Bare Feet With Mickela Mallozzi
Beyond Your Backyard
Born to Explore With Richard Wiese
Burt Wolf: Travels & Traditions

Affiliates

References

Television networks in the United States
Public television in the United States
Television channels and stations established in 2006
English-language television stations in the United States
Digital television in the United States
DIY culture